Mieko Yagi (9 June 1950 – 24 November 2015) was a Japanese equestrian. She competed in two events at the 2008 Summer Olympics.

References

1950 births
2015 deaths
Japanese female equestrians
Japanese dressage riders
Olympic equestrians of Japan
Equestrians at the 2008 Summer Olympics
Sportspeople from Tokyo
Asian Games medalists in equestrian
Equestrians at the 1994 Asian Games
Asian Games gold medalists for Japan
Medalists at the 1994 Asian Games
20th-century Japanese women